Marmaduke is a masculine given name.

As an English name, it is derived from the two parts of the name.

 The Latin root word MARMA which means a "piece of sculptured or inscribed marble" and was taken directly into Old English as marma (German Marmor is restored Latin from Old High German marmul). The Latin is related to the ancient Greek μάρμαρος meaning shining stone. According to the Oxford English Dictionary the Latin word was adopted early into the Germanic languages: Old English marma (in compounds also marm- : see marm-stone n.), marmor- , marmel- (only in the compound marmorstān , marmelstān : see marmor n.), Old High German marmul , murmul (Middle High German marmel , mermel , German Marmor (the stone), Murmel (as a toy; compare sense A. 11a)), Middle Dutch marmer , marmel (more commonly marber , marbel < Old French; Dutch marmer (the stone), marmel (as a toy, now archaic; compare sense A. 11a)), Old Icelandic marmari , Old Swedish malmare , (in compounds) malmar- , marmer- , marmor- (Swedish marmor ).
 DUKE directly from Latin dux (genitive ducis) "leader, commander," in Late Latin "governor of a province," from ducere "to lead," from PIE root *deuk- "to lead."

A historical reference is found a genealogy book where the author references his relative named Marmaduke: "The name Marmaduke is from the Anglo-Saxon and means “a mighty noble."

As an Irish name, Marmaduke is interpreted as meaning "follower of Saint Máedóc".

People with the surname
 John S. Marmaduke, 25th Governor of Missouri
 Meredith Miles Marmaduke, 8th Governor of Missouri
 Thomas Marmaduke, English explorer

People with the given name
 Marmaduke Barton (1865–1938), English pianist
 Marmaduke Constable, 15th-century English soldier
 Marmaduke Davenport, pseudonym for British confidence trickster Alexander Day
 Marmaduke Dixon (mountaineer) (1862–1918), New Zealand farmer and mountaineer
 Marmaduke Dixon (settler) (1828–1895), New Zealand farmer and local politician
 Marmaduke Dove, American politician
 Marmaduke Furness, 1st Viscount Furness (1883–1940), British shipping magnate
 Marmaduke Grove (1878–1954), Chilean Air Force officer and political figure
 Marmaduke Hussey, Baron Hussey of North Bradley, Chairman of the BBC
 Marmaduke Langdale, High Sheriff of Yorkshire
 Marmaduke Alexander Lawson (1840–1896), British botanist
 Marmaduke Lumley, 15th-century English priest
 Marmaduke Pattle, RAF flying ace
 Marmaduke Pickthall, Islamic scholar
 Marmaduke Stone (1748–1834), English Jesuit priest
 Marmaduke Tunstall, English ornithologist
 Marmaduke Tweng, 13/14th century, English knight and captain during the Wars of Scottish Independence
 Marmaduke Williams, U.S. congressman from North Carolina
 Marmaduke Wyvill (disambiguation), several, including:
Marmaduke Wyvill (MP for Ripon) (died 1558), MP for Ripon
Sir Marmaduke Wyvill, 1st Baronet	(c.1542–1617),  Member of Parliament (MP) for Richmond
Sir Marmaduke Wyvill, 5th Baronet	(c.1666–1722),  MP for Richmond
Sir Marmaduke Wyvill, 6th Baronet	(c.1692–1754),  MP for Richmond
Marmaduke Wyvill (1791–1872), Whig MP for York
Marmaduke Wyvill (chess player) (1815–1896), English chess master and Liberal MP for Richmond
Marmaduke D'Arcy Wyvill (1849–1918), Conservative MP for Otley

People with the stage name
 John Dawson (musician), known as "Marmaduke", American country-rock musician
 John Smoltz, known as "Smoltzie" and "Marmaduke", American baseball pitcher

See also
 Marmaduke (disambiguation)

References